It's Only Money is a 1962 American comedy film directed by Frank Tashlin and starring Jerry Lewis and was released by Paramount Pictures.  It was the final film of Zachary Scott.

Plot
Lester March is a 25-year-old orphan who is an electronics repairman. However, his real passion is detective novels, and he dreams of becoming a detective himself someday. His best friend, Pete Flint, is a detective, and they see a television program about a wealthy, single woman, Cecilia Albright who is looking for her long-lost nephew. The mention of a $100,000 reward gains their attention.

Flint allows March to join him in sneaking into the Albright mansion in hopes of solving the mystery and collecting the reward. During their break-in, Albright's lawyer sees them and recognizes March as being the long-lost nephew, Charles Albright, Jr.  The lawyer was responsible for Charles Albright, Sr.'s death, and his plan is to marry Cecilia and kill her to inherit the entire fortune.  With the help of the butler, they plan to kill March so he does not interfere with that plan.

The family nurse, Wanda Paxton discovers March's identity and falls in love with him.  The lawyer's plans are foiled, March's identity is revealed, and Paxton and March are married.

Cast
 Jerry Lewis as Lester
 Joan O'Brien as Wanda
 Zachary Scott as Gregory DeWitt
 Jack Weston as Leopold
 Mae Questel as Cecilia
 Jesse White as Pete Flint
 Francine York as Sexy Girl
 Barbara Pepper as the Fisherwoman

Production
Filming was from October 9 to December 17, 1961.

Home media
The film was released on DVD and Blu-ray on March 27, 2012.

References

External links 
 
 

1962 films
1960s comedy mystery films
American black-and-white films
American comedy mystery films
American detective films
1960s English-language films
Films directed by Frank Tashlin
Films scored by Walter Scharf
Paramount Pictures films
1962 comedy films
1960s American films